F. concinna may refer to:

 Ficus concinna, a fig tree
 Fissurella concinna, a sea snail
 Fulgoraria concinna, a sea snail
 Fungia concinna, a plate coral